Hull is provincial electoral riding located in the Outaouais region of Quebec, Canada. It includes the entire Hull sector of the city of Gatineau, as well as some additional territory.

It was created for the 1919 election from part of the Ottawa electoral district.

In the change from the 2001 to the 2011 electoral map, it gained some territory from Pontiac and also a very small amount of territory from Gatineau electoral district.

Members of the Legislative Assembly / National Assembly

Election results

|-
 
|Liberal
|Maryse Gaudreault
|align="right"|7,403
|align="right"|45.21
|align="right"|+2.68

|-

|-
 
|Liberal
|Roch Cholette
|align="right"|16262
|align="right"|57.25
|align="right"|-2.05

|-

|-

|-

|Independent
|Maxime Gauld
|align="right"|155
|align="right"|0.55
|align="right"|-
|-

|-

|Independent
|Gheorghe Irimia
|align="right"|37
|align="right"|0.13
|align="right"|-
|-
|}

|-
 
|Liberal
|Roch Cholette
|align="right"|18,873
|align="right"|59.30
|align="right"|+2.74

|-
 
|Socialist Democracy
|Marc Bonhomme
|align="right"|291
|align="right"|0.91
|align="right"|-
|-

|Natural Law
|Rita Bouchard
|align="right"|266
|align="right"|0.84
|align="right"|-
|-

|-

|Independent
|Gheorghe Irimia
|align="right"|37
|align="right"|0.13
|align="right"|-
|-
|}

References

External links
Information
 Elections Quebec

Election results
 Election results (National Assembly)

Maps
 2011 map (PDF)
 2001 map (Flash)
2001–2011 changes (Flash)
1992–2001 changes (Flash)
 Electoral map of Outaouais region
 Quebec electoral map, 2011

Politics of Gatineau
Hull
1919 establishments in Quebec